A Light in the Dark is the eighth studio album by American heavy metal band Metal Church, released on June 16, 2006 in Germany, June 19 in the rest of Europe, and June 27 in the US. This was the third Metal Church album to feature the cruciform Gibson Explorer on a cover, as well as the last to feature Jay Reynolds on guitar. It was also the first to feature Jeff Plate on drums.

"Watch the Children Pray 2006" is a remake of their song with the same name from their album The Dark, recorded and dedicated to late vocalist David Wayne.

Reception

AllMusic Greg Prato reviewed the album positively and commented that it is "unmistakably" Metal Church, in spite of the fact that only Kurdt Vanderhoof is the only remaining founding member of the band who performs on the record. Prato stated that A Light in the Dark "could easily be mistaken for a thrash metal release of the '80s" because of songs like "A Light in the Dark" and "Beyond All Reason". Keith Bergman of Blabbermouth.net had the same feeling, as the production "seems designed to recall past glories", but praised A Light in the Dark for being "more cohesive, more like a band effort, and not coincidentally, the most consistent album since the band's heyday with late frontman David Wayne." Rock Hard reviewer called it a "good, in the most positive sense, old-fashioned metal album with a balanced mix of proven power riffs, beautiful melodies and some sing-along choruses", though it did not approach qualitatively the band's early classics. Greg Pratt of Exclaim! wrote that "Metal Church are proving themselves to be a dependable metal institution", but criticized the album for being too long, for having "too many mid-tempo blah rockers" and for the "sense of melodrama that dogs down" many songs.

Track listing

Personnel
Metal Church
Ronny Munroe – lead vocals
Jay Reynolds – lead guitar
Kurdt Vanderhoof – rhythm guitar, keyboards, producer, engineer, mixing
Steve Unger – bass, backing vocals
Jeff Plate – drums

Production
Mark Greer – mixing
Kai Swillus – artwork

References

2006 albums
Metal Church albums
SPV/Steamhammer albums